James Donald McElmury (born October 3, 1949 in Saint Paul, Minnesota) is an American retired professional ice hockey player who played 180 games in the National Hockey League between 1972 and 1978 for the Minnesota North Stars, Kansas City Scouts, and Colorado Rockies. Prior to turning professional McElmury played for Bemidji State University. Internationally McElmury played for the American national team at several World Championships and the 1972 Winter Olympics.

Playing career
He played with the Minnesota North Stars, Kansas City Scouts and the Colorado Rockies after starring for the Bemidji State University ice hockey team. Aside from playing in the NHL McElmury spent time in various minor leagues, primarily the American Hockey League.

International play

McElmury played for the American national team several times during his career. His first tournament was the 1970 World Championship, where the United States played in Pool B, the second tier. The Americans were promoted for the 1971 World Championship and McElmury returned for that, playing 10 games and scoring 2 goals. He also played at the 1972 Winter Olympics, helping the United States win a silver medal; McElmury played 6 games and had 1 assist. McElmury's last international tournament was the 1977 World Championships, recording 5 points in 10 games.

Career statistics

Regular season and playoffs

International

References
 

1949 births
American men's ice hockey defensemen
Bemidji State Beavers men's ice hockey players
Cleveland Barons (1937–1973) players
Colorado Rockies (NHL) players
Hampton Gulls (AHL) players
Ice hockey people from Saint Paul, Minnesota
Kansas City Scouts players
Living people
Minnesota North Stars players
Ice hockey players at the 1972 Winter Olympics
Olympic silver medalists for the United States in ice hockey
Portland Buckaroos players
Rhode Island Reds players
Springfield Indians players
Medalists at the 1972 Winter Olympics
Undrafted National Hockey League players